Blissymbols or Blissymbolics is a constructed language conceived as an ideographic writing system called Semantography consisting of several hundred basic symbols, each representing a concept, which can be composed together to generate new symbols that represent new concepts. Blissymbols differ from most of the world's major writing systems in that the characters do not correspond at all to the sounds of any spoken language.

Blissymbols was published by Charles K. Bliss in 1949 and found use in the education of people with communication difficulties.

History
Blissymbols was invented by Charles K. Bliss (1897–1985), born Karl Kasiel Blitz in the Austro-Hungarian city of Czernowitz (at present the Ukrainian city of Chernivtsi), which had a mixture of different nationalities that "hated each other, mainly because they spoke and thought in different languages." 
Bliss graduated as a chemical engineer at the Vienna University of Technology, and joined an electronics company as a research chemist.

After the annexation of Austria into Nazi Germany in 1938, Bliss, a Jew, was sent to the concentration camps of Dachau and Buchenwald. His German wife Claire managed to get him released, and they finally became exiles in Shanghai, where Bliss had a cousin.

Bliss devised Blissymbols while a refugee at the Shanghai Ghetto and Sydney, from 1942 to 1949. He wanted to create an easy-to-learn international auxiliary language to allow communication between different linguistic communities. He was inspired by Chinese characters, with which he became familiar at Shanghai.

Bliss's system was explained in his work Semantography (1949, 2nd ed. 1965, 3rd ed. 1978.)
It had several names:

As the "tourist explosion" took place in the 1960s, a number of researchers were looking for new standard symbols to be used at roads, stations, airports, etc. Bliss then adopted the name Blissymbolics in order that no researcher could plagiarize his system of symbols.

Since the 1960s/1970s, Blissymbols have become popular as a method to teach disabled people to communicate.
In 1971 Shirley McNaughton started a pioneer program at the Ontario Crippled Children's Centre (OCCC), aimed at children with cerebral palsy, from the approach of augmentative and alternative communication (AAC). According to Arika Okrent, Bliss used to complain about the way the teachers at the OCCC were using the symbols, in relation with the proportions of the symbols and other questions: for example, they used "fancy" terms like "nouns" and "verbs", to describe what Bliss called "things" and "actions". (2009, p. 173-4).
The ultimate objective of the OCCC program was to use Blissymbols as a practical way to teach the children to express themselves in their mother tongue, since the Blissymbols provided visual keys to understand the meaning of the English words, especially the abstract words.

In his work Semantography Bliss had not provided a systematic set of definitions for his symbols (there was a provisional vocabulary index instead  (1965, pp. 827–67)), so McNaughton's team might often interpret a certain symbol in a way that Bliss would later criticize as a "misinterpretation". For example, they might interpret a tomato as a vegetable —according to the English definition of tomato— even though the ideal Blissymbol of vegetable was restricted by Bliss to just vegetables growing underground. Eventually the OCCC staff modified and adapted Bliss's system in order to make it serve as a bridge to English. (2009, p. 189) Bliss' complaints about his symbols "being abused" by the OCCC became so intense that the director of the OCCC told Bliss, on his 1974 visit, never to come back. In spite of this, in 1975 Bliss granted an exclusive world license, for use with disabled children, to the new Blissymbolics Communication Foundation directed by Shirley McNaughton (later called Blissymbolics Communication International, BCI). Nevertheless, in 1977 Bliss claimed that this agreement was violated so that he was deprived of effective control of his symbol system.

According to Okrent (2009, p. 190), there was a final period of conflict, as Bliss would make continuous criticisms to McNaughton often followed by apologies. Bliss finally brought his lawyers back to the OCCC, and both parts reached a settlement:

Blissymbolic Communication International now claims an exclusive license from Bliss, for the use and publication of Blissymbols for persons with communication, language, and learning difficulties.

The Blissymbol method has been used in Canada, Sweden, and a few other countries. Practitioners of Blissymbolics (that is, speech and language therapists and users) maintain that some users who have learned to communicate with Blissymbolics find it easier to learn to read and write traditional orthography in the local spoken language than do users who did not know Blissymbolics.

The speech question 
Unlike similar constructed languages like aUI, Blissymbolics was conceived as a written language with no phonology, on the premise that "interlinguistic communication is mainly carried on by reading and writing". Nevertheless, Bliss suggested that a set of international words could be adopted, so that "a kind of spoken language could be established – as a travelling aid only". (1965, p. 89–90).

Whether Blissymbolics constitutes an unspoken language is a controversial question, whatever its practical utility may be.  Some linguists, such as John DeFrancis and J. Marshall Unger have argued that genuine ideographic writing systems with the same capacities as natural languages do not exist.

Semantics 

Bliss' concern about semantics finds an early referent in John Locke, whose Essay Concerning Human Understanding prevented people from those "vague and insignificant forms of speech" that may give the impression of being deep learning.

Another vital referent is Leibniz's project of an ideographic language called "universal character", based on the principles of Chinese characters. It would contain small figures representing "visible things by their lines, and the invisible, by the visible which accompany them", as well as adding "certain additional marks, suitable to make understood the flexions and the particles." Bliss stated that his own work was an attempt to take up the thread of Leibniz's project.

Finally there is a strong influence by the work The Meaning of Meaning (1923) by C. K. Ogden and I. A. Richards, which was considered a standard work on semantics. Bliss found especially useful their "triangle of reference": the physical thing or "referent" that we perceive would be represented at the right vertex; the meaning that we know by experience (our implicit definition of the thing), at the top vertex; and the physical word that we speak or symbol we write, at the left vertex. The reversed process would happen when we read or listen to words: from the words, we recall meanings, related to referents which may be real things or unreal "fictions". Bliss was particularly concerned with political propaganda, whose discourses would tend to contain words that correspond to unreal or ambiguous referents.

Grammar 
The grammar of Blissymbols is based on a certain interpretation of nature, dividing it into matter (material things), energy (actions), and human values (mental evaluations). In an ordinary language, these would give place respectively to nouns, verbs, and adjectives. In Blissymbols, they are marked respectively by a small square symbol, a small cone symbol, and a small V or inverted cone. These symbols may be placed above any other symbol, turning it respectively into a "thing", an "action", and an "evaluation":

When a symbol is not marked by any of the three grammar symbols (square, cone, inverted cone), it may refer to a non-material thing, a grammatical particle, etc.

Examples 

The symbol above represents the expression "world language", which was a first tentative name for Blissymbols.
It combines the symbol for "writing tool" or "pen" (a line inclined, as a pen being used) with the symbol for "world", which in its turn combines "ground" or "earth" (a horizontal line below) and its counterpart derivate "sky" (a horizontal line above). Thus the world would be seen as "what is among the ground and the sky", and "Blissymbols" would be seen as "the writing tool to express the world". This is clearly distinct from the symbol of "language", which is a combination of "mouth" and "ear". Thus natural languages are mainly oral, while Blissymbols is just a writing system dealing with semantics, not phonetics.

The 900 individual symbols of the system are called "Bliss-characters"; these may be "ideographic" – representing abstract concepts, "pictographic" – a direct representation of objects, or "composite" – in which two or more existing Bliss-characters have been superimposed to represent a new meaning. Size, orientation and relation to the "skyline" and "earthline" affects the meaning of each symbol. A single concept is called a "Bliss-word", which can consist of one or more Bliss-characters. In the case of multiple character Bliss-words, the main character is called the "classifier" which "indicates the semantic or grammatical category to which the Bliss-word belongs". To this can be added Bliss-characters as prefixes or suffixes called "modifiers" which amend the meaning of the first symbol. A further symbol called an "indicator" can be added above one of the characters in the Bliss-word (typically the classifier); these are used as "grammatical and/or semantic markers."

This sentence means "I want to go to the cinema." This example shows several features of Blissymbolics:
 The pronoun "I" is formed of the Bliss-character for "person" and the number 1 (the first person). Using the number 2 would give the symbol for singular "You"; adding the plural indicator (a small cross at the top) would produce the pronouns "We" and plural "You".
 The Bliss-word for "to want" contains the heart which symbolizes "feeling" (the classifier), plus the serpentine line which symbolizes "fire" (the modifier), and the verb (called "action") indicator at the top.
 The Bliss-word for "to go" is composed of the Bliss-character for "leg" and the verb indicator.
 The Bliss-word for "cinema" is composed of the Bliss-character for "house" (the classifier), and "film" (the modifier); "film" is a composite character composed of "camera" and the arrow indicating movement.

Towards the international standardization of the script 

Blissymbolics was used in 1971 to help children at the Ontario Crippled Children's Centre (OCCC, now the Holland Bloorview Kids Rehabilitation Hospital) in Toronto, Ontario, Canada. Since it was important that the children see consistent pictures, OCCC had a draftsman named Jim Grice draw the symbols. Both Charles K. Bliss and Margrit Beesley at the OCCC worked with Grice to ensure consistency. In 1975, a new organization named Blissymbolics Communication Foundation directed by Shirley McNaughton led this effort. Over the years, this organization changed its name to Blissymbolics Communication Institute, Easter Seal Communication Institute, and ultimately to Blissymbolics Communication International (BCI).

BCI is an international group of people who act as an authority regarding the standardization of the Blissymbolics language. It has taken responsibility for any extensions of the Blissymbolics language as well as any maintenance needed for the language. BCI has coordinated usage of the language since 1971 for augmentative and alternative communication. BCI received a licence and copyright through legal agreements with Charles K. Bliss in 1975 and 1982.  Limiting the count of Bliss-characters (there are currently about 900) is very useful in order to help the user community. It also helps when implementing Blissymbolics using technology such as computers.

In 1991, BCI published a reference guide  containing 2300 vocabulary items and detailed rules for the graphic design of additional characters, so they settled a first set of approved Bliss-words for general use.
The Standards Council of Canada then sponsored, on January 21, 1993, the registration of an encoded character set for use in ISO/IEC 2022, in the ISO-IR international registry of coded character sets.
After many years of requests, the Blissymbolic language was finally approved as an encoded language, with code , into the ISO 639-2 and ISO 639-3 standards.

A proposal was posted by Michael Everson for the Blissymbolics script to be included in the Universal Character Set (UCS) and encoded for use with the ISO/IEC 10646 and Unicode standards. BCI would cooperate with the Unicode Technical Committee (UTC) and the ISO Working Group.
The proposed encoding does not use the lexical encoding model used in the existing ISO-IR/169 registered character set, but instead applies the Unicode and ISO character-glyph model to the Bliss-character model already adopted by BCI, since this would significantly reduce the number of needed characters. Bliss-characters can now be used in a creative way to create many new arbitrary concepts, by surrounding the invented words with special Bliss indicators (similar to punctuation), something which was not possible in the ISO-IR/169 encoding.

However, at the end of 2009, the Blissymbolic script is still not encoded in the UCS. Some questions are still unanswered, such as the inclusion in the BCI repertoire of some characters (currently about 24) that are already encoded in the UCS (like digits, punctuation signs, spaces and some markers), but whose unification may cause problems due to the very strict graphical layouts required by the published Bliss reference guides. In addition, the character metrics use a specific layout where the usual baseline is not used, and the ideographic em-square is not relevant for Bliss character designs, that use additional "earth line" and "sky line" to define the composition square.  
Some fonts supporting the BCI repertoire are available and usable with texts encoded with private-use assignments (PUA) within the UCS. But only the private BCI encoding based on ISO-IR/169 registration is available for text interchange.

See also 
 Egyptian hieroglyphs
 Esperanto
 iConji
 Isotype
 Kanji

References

External links 

 
 Blissymbol Communication UK
 An Introduction to Blissymbols (PDF file)
  Standard two-byte encoded character set for Blissymbols, from the ISO-IR international registry of character sets, registration number 169 (1993-01-21).
 Michael Everson's First proposed encoding into Unicode and ISO/IEC 10646 of Blissymbolics characters, based on the decomposition of the ISO-IR/169 repertoire.
 Radiolab program about Charles Bliss – Broadcast December 2012 – the item about Charles Bliss starts after 5 minutes and is approx 30 mins long.

Engineered languages
Auxiliary and educational artificial scripts
International auxiliary languages
Pictograms
Augmentative and alternative communication
Writing systems introduced in 1949
Constructed languages
Constructed languages introduced in the 1940s